Lydia Fairchild (born 1976) is an American woman who exhibits chimerism, having two distinct populations of DNA among the cells of her body.  She was pregnant with her third child when she and the father of her children, Jamie Townsend, separated. When Fairchild applied for enforcement of child support in 2002, providing DNA evidence of Townsend's paternity was a routine requirement. While the results showed Townsend to certainly be their father, they seemed to rule out her being their mother.

Fairchild stood accused of fraud by either claiming benefits for other people's children, or taking part in a surrogacy scam, and records of her prior births were put similarly in doubt. Prosecutors called for her two children to be taken away from her, believing them not to be hers. As time came for her to give birth to her third child, the judge ordered that an observer be present at the birth, ensure that blood samples were immediately taken from both the child and Fairchild, and be available to testify. Two weeks later, DNA tests seemed to indicate that she was also not the mother of that child.

A breakthrough came when her defense attorney, Alan Tindell, learned of Karen Keegan, a chimeric woman in Boston, and suggested a similar possibility for Fairchild and then introduced an article in the New England Journal of Medicine about Keegan. He realized that Fairchild's case might also be caused by chimerism. As in Keegan's case, DNA samples were taken from members of the extended family. The DNA of Fairchild's children matched that of Fairchild's mother to the extent expected of a grandmother. They also found that, although the DNA in Fairchild's skin and hair did not match her children's, the DNA from a cervical smear test did match. Fairchild was carrying two different sets of DNA (with one of them of being her unborn twin's), the defining characteristic of chimerism.

See also 
 Mater semper certa est

Notes

References
 ABC News: She's Her Own Twin Article on Fairchild 
 Kids' DNA Tested, Parent Informed The DNA Is Not A Match Article on Fairchild's case
 The Stranger Within New Scientist Article on Karen Keegan's case
 Genetic Mosaics Discussion on Tetragametic Humans
 DNA Tests Shed Light on 'Hybrid Humans' NPR recording.

20th-century American women
21st-century American women
1976 births
Applied genetics
Chimerism
Living people
20th-century American people